Petronio may refer to:

People:
Petronio Álvarez Quintero (1920–1966), the author of a currulao known as Mi Buenaventura
Petronio Franceschini (1650–1680), Baroque music composer from Bologna
Petrônio Gontijo (born 1968), Brazilian actor
Renato Petronio (1891–1976), Italian rower
Stephen Petronio, artistic director, choreographer and dancer based in New York City
John Petronio, high tech entrepreneur, win-loss analysis consultant based in Lexington Massachusetts

Churches:
San Petronio Basilica, the main church of Bologna, the old città d'arte in the Emilia Romagna region of Italy
Santi Giovanni Evangelista e Petronio, the national church of the Bolognese on the Via del Mascherone, Rome